Maria Valberkhova (1789 – 1867), was a Russian stage actress.  She was engaged at the Imperial Theatres in 1807-1855, during which she had a successful career and referred to as the elite of her profession of her generation. Initially a tragedienne, she focused on comedies after the tragic parts was taken over by Ekaterina Semenova and became successful within comedy and eventually as a character actress.

References

1789 births
1867 deaths
19th-century actresses from the Russian Empire
Russian stage actresses